Cleotha "Chico" Walker (born November 25, 1957) is an American former professional baseball utility player. He played for four teams in Major League Baseball (MLB) in all or parts of 11 seasons spanning from 1980–1993.

Biography
Well known for his versatility, Walker, a graduate of Chicago's Tilden High School, played at least 40 games at five different positions in his MLB career, appearing at third base, second base, and all three outfield positions. His most productive season came in 1992, when he posted a combined .289 batting average with 38 RBI in 126 games for the Cubs and Mets, all career numbers. Additionally, Walker spent 19 seasons in Minor League Baseball, compiling a .269 average with 154 home runs and 725 RBI in 1646 games.

Walker also played in Mexico, the Dominican Republic, Venezuela and Puerto Rico, and had a stint as a manager with the Cook County Cheetahs of the Frontier League in 1999.

While playing for Triple-A Pawtucket Red Sox, Walker participated in the longest game in professional baseball history. It lasted for 33 innings spread over two months, with eight hours and 25 minutes of playing time. 32 innings were played on April 18–19, 1981, at McCoy Stadium in Pawtucket, Rhode Island, and the visiting Rochester Red Wings were tied with the Red Sox, 2–2. The 33rd and final inning took place on June 23 and Pawtucket finally won, 3–2.

Family ties
Walker is the uncle of National Basketball Association player Antoine Walker.

Sources

External links
, or Retrosheet

1957 births
Living people
African-American baseball players
Águilas Cibaeñas players
American expatriate baseball players in Canada
American expatriate baseball players in Mexico
Baseball players from Jackson, Mississippi
Boston Red Sox players
Bristol Red Sox players
California Angels players
Charlotte Knights players
Chicago Cubs players
Edmonton Trappers players
Elmira Pioneers players
Iowa Cubs players
Major League Baseball outfielders
Major League Baseball second basemen
Major League Baseball third basemen
Minor league baseball managers
Naranjeros de Hermosillo players
New York Mets players
Pawtucket Red Sox players
People from Batesville, Mississippi
Rojos del Águila de Veracruz players
Senadores de San Juan players
Syracuse Chiefs players
Tigres de Aragua players
American expatriate baseball players in Venezuela
Tigres del Licey players
American expatriate baseball players in the Dominican Republic
Winter Haven Red Sox players
21st-century African-American people
20th-century African-American sportspeople